Sir Paul Leonard Fox,  (born 27 October 1925) is a British television executive, who spent much of his broadcasting career working for BBC Television, most prominently as the Controller of BBC1 between 1967 and 1973.

Early life
Fox was educated in Bournemouth and served in the Parachute Regiment, 1943–46.

BBC career
Fox began his career at the Corporation in the 1950s, writing scripts for the Television Newsreel programme before going on to create and edit the popular sports programme Sportsview. While editing Sportsview in 1954 he hit upon the idea of creating the annual BBC Sports Personality of the Year award, a glittering ceremony that is still held every December by the Corporation and seen as one of the major events in British sport.

By the early 1960s he had been promoted to Editor of Panorama and later Head of Public Affairs at BBC Television and in this role was heavily involved in the news coverage of the assassination of U.S. President John F. Kennedy in 1963 and the subsequent reaction to the events in the UK. 

In 1967, he became the Controller of BBC1 a post he held for six years, one of the longest tenures of any BBC Channel Controller. His achievements in the role included the launch of the enduring Dad's Army and overseeing the transition of BBC1 into colour in 1969. He also commissioned The Two Ronnies, Bruce Forsyth and the Generation Game and the Parkinson talk show in 1971. All the Moon landings of Project Apollo occurred during his tenure, and Fox allocated generous time on his network for coverage.

Later career
Ward Thomas brought in Fox as Head of Programmes of Yorkshire Television (YTV) in 1973, and later became managing director of Yorkshire Television between 1977 and 1988. During this period he was quite vocal in his disapproval of the ultimately unsuccessful poaching in 1985 of Dallas from the BBC by fellow ITV contractor Thames Television. This permanently soured his relationship with Thames executive Bryan Cowgill, who had been a former colleague at the BBC.

Whilst at YTV, Fox was prominent in representing the managerial view in the industrial dispute between members of the ACTT trade union and the ITV companies, which blacked out the network for three months in 1979. He was chairman of ITN from 1986 to 1988 and later managing director of BBC Television (1988–91). Fox retired from the BBC at the age of 65 in 1991 and became chairman of the Racecourse Association from 1993 to 1997, chairman of DISASTERS EMERC Committee from 1996 to 1999 and a sports columnist for The Daily Telegraph from 1991 to 2003.

Honours
Fox was honoured with a CBE in 1985 and was knighted in 1991. He was awarded the Honorary degree of Doctor of Laws (LL.D.) by Leeds University in 1984 * , and the  Honorary degree of Doctor of Letters (D.Litt.) from  Bradford University in 1991, and the Royal Television Society Gold Medal for Outstanding Services to television in 1992.

References

1925 births
Living people
BBC One controllers
British television executives
BAFTA fellows
Commanders of the Order of the British Empire
Knights Bachelor
Mass media people from Bournemouth
International Emmy Founders Award winners
British Parachute Regiment soldiers
British Army personnel of World War II
Yorkshire Television